Rear Admiral Dennis Royle Farquharson Cambell,  (13 November 1907 – 6 April 2000) was a flag officer of the Royal Navy, who invented the angled flight deck.

Naval career
Educated at Westminster School, Cambell was a Special Entry Cadet from 1925 in the training ship .

Having been made acting sub-lieutenant at the start of 1929, he started lieutenants courses at the Royal Naval College, Greenwich, and continued from 12 August 1929 at Portsmouth. As sub-lieutenant he joined the destroyer, Atlantic Fleet, on 23 March 1930. From September 1930 to the following August he was based at RAF Leuchars, having been made lieutenant in December 1930.

In November 1932 they disembarked to RAF Netheravon. In April 1936 he joined the twin-screw minesweeper,  as First Lieutenant (second-in-command). In 1938 he joined the newly formed 803 Squadron (Osprey IIIs) at RAF Worthy Down.

Cambell served in the Second World War, initially as Commanding Officer of 803 Naval Air Squadron, now with Blackburn Skua IIs instead of Ospreys. On 14 September 1939 they lost two Skuas from the sub-flight he was leading whilst attacking  and on 26 September they shot down a Dornier Do 18, this being the first German aircraft to be shot down during the Second World War by any British aircraft.

In June 1940 Cambell became a test pilot at the Aeroplane and Armament Experimental Establishment (A&AEE) at RAF Boscombe Down. While there he was called upon to test fly and deck-land the Firebrand with which Blackburn test pilots were having difficulties.

After the war Cambell was appointed to the Naval Staff in the Admiralty in the Naval Air Warfare and Flying Training Division. In December 1948 he was promoted to captain, and in 1950 he was once again assigned to HMS President "for miscellaneous services", which meant that he was working at the Ministry of Supply. It was during this period that he devised the angled flight deck working in collaboration with Lewis Boddington of RAF Farnborough.

In September 1954 Cambell was appointed as the first captain of the new carrier , which was commissioned in February 1955. In September 1956 he was again at the Admiralty this time as Director of Naval Air Warfare.    
 
Cambell's final appointment was as Flag Officer, Flying Training at Yeovilton from 15 October 1957.  In 1958 he was made an Officer of the American Legion of Merit and in 1960, on retirement, he was appointed a Companion of the Order of the Bath (London Gazette 1.1.60; Investiture 9.2.60.)  From 19 October 1960 he was in the Retired List. On retirement he became European Sales Director for Hiller and then Hughes Helicopters, and then Director of Executive Travel.

References

External links
Dennis Cambell
How the Royal Navy changed US Naval Aviation

1907 births
2000 deaths
People from Southsea
Military personnel from Portsmouth
Graduates of the Royal Naval College, Greenwich
Royal Navy rear admirals
People educated at Westminster School, London
Recipients of the Distinguished Service Cross (United Kingdom)
Royal Naval Air Service aviators
British World War II pilots
British World War II bomber pilots
Officers of the Legion of Merit
Royal Navy officers of World War II